Wayne Krieger (born September 1940) is an American Republican politician, retired game warden, and tree farmer from Gold Beach on the southern coast of the U.S. state of Oregon. He served on the Oregon State Police Force from 1964 to 1991. He represented District 1 (formerly District 48) of the Oregon House of Representatives from 2001 until 2017.

Early life, education, and law enforcement career
He was born in 1940 in Portland and was raised in Seaside, Oregon. He graduated from Oregon Institute of Technology (OIT) in 1961.

He was an Oregon State Police officer for over 27 years. He served in the Game Enforcement Division, enforcing fish and wildlife laws. He retired in July 1991.

He was a Forestry adviser for former State Representative Walt Schroeder.

He has won numerous awards including Coos-Curry Tree Farmer of the Year (1981), Oregon Tree Farmer of the Year (1992), National Tree Farmer of the Year (1993), and Curry County Conservation Farmer of the Year (1993).

Oregon House of Representatives

Elections
In 2000, he ran for the 48th district of the Oregon House of Representatives. He defeated Democrat Barbara Dodrill 56%–44%. After redistricting, he decided to run in Oregon's 1st house district. In 2002, he won re-election to a second term by defeating Democrat Dave Tilton 66%–33%. He won re-election in 2004 (64%), 2006 (73%), 2008 (61%), 2010 (72%), and 2012 (68%).

Tenure
Krieger is pro-life. When he was Chairman of the Judiciary Committee, he was disappointed when they failed to pass a bill that make violence against pregnant women a two-person victim offense.

In 2005, he opposed legalizing civil unions or gay marriage for LGBT couples.

In 2011, he supported medical marijuana. In 2013, he voted in favor of marijuana legalization in Judiciary Committee.

Committee assignments
Agriculture and Natural Resources
Judiciary (Vice-Chair)
Public Safety
State and Federal Affairs (Chair)

See also
 75th Oregon Legislative Assembly (2009–2010)
 74th Oregon Legislative Assembly (2007–2008)

References

External links
 Official legislative web page

1940 births
Living people
Politicians from Portland, Oregon
Republican Party members of the Oregon House of Representatives
People from Gold Beach, Oregon
American state police officers
Oregon police officers
Oregon Institute of Technology alumni
21st-century American politicians